Inger Knutsson (later Stålhandske; born 8 May 1955) is a Swedish middle-distance runner. She competed in the 1500 m event at the 1972 Summer Olympics, but failed to reach the final.

References

1955 births
Living people
Athletes (track and field) at the 1972 Summer Olympics
Swedish female middle-distance runners
Olympic athletes of Sweden
Place of birth missing (living people)